Couldn't Be Fairer is a 1984 Australian documentary film directed by Dennis O'Rourke and narrated by Aboriginal activist Mick Miller, which paints a disturbing portrait of Indigenous life in Australia's Deep South, the northern state of Queensland. The title of the film references a 1983 statement about Aboriginal Australians made by Joh Bjelke-Petersen, the Premier of Queensland at the time: "We treat them the same as everyone else – couldn't be fairer."

Synopsis
Couldn't Be Fairer reveals how Australia's first people are still suffering from social oppression, with many living on reservations where alcoholism is rampant and unemployment the major occupation. Aboriginal land rights are a central theme: Miller clearly demonstrates the contrast between the attitudes of European Australians, who see the land only as a resource to be mined, farmed, grazed and built upon, and Aboriginal Australians, who regard the land as sacred. Archival footage compares the original lifestyle of Aboriginal Australians to their current pitiful condition, and shows how European settlers attempted to "civilize" mixed blood children by taking them away from their parents and enrolling them in boarding schools.

The film ends on an optimistic note, with Miller introducing the audience to a cattle station in northern Queensland called Delta Downs Station, which is owned and successfully run by Aboriginal Australians. Miller asserts that if the government would give sovereignty of the land and reserves back to the Aboriginal people, they would be able to show the world what they are capable of achieving.

Mick Miller died in 1998.

Production
Noting the importance of a documentary about Aboriginal Australian rights in Queensland, Mick Miller stated that:

Reviews

References

External links
Couldn't Be Fairer at CameraWork, Dennis O'Rourke's production company
Clip 1 from Australian Screen
Clip 2 from Australian Screen
Clip 3 from Australian Screen

1984 films
Films set in Queensland
Australian documentary films
Documentary films about Aboriginal Australians
Racism in Australia
1980s English-language films